The Camp Williams Hostess House/Officers' Club is a historic building located on Camp W. G. Williams in Bluffdale (Utah County}, Utah, United States, that is listed on the National Register of Historic Places {NRHP).

Description
It was built as the camp military officers' club in 1935. Its historic significance is largely as a Public Works Administration project; WPA works during the depression were widespread in Utah and this is a good example.

It was added to the NRHP April 1, 1985.

See also

 National Register of Historic Places listings in Utah County, Utah

References

External links

Government buildings completed in 1935
Clubhouses on the National Register of Historic Places in Utah
Government buildings on the National Register of Historic Places in Utah
Houses on the National Register of Historic Places in Utah
Houses in Utah County, Utah
National Register of Historic Places in Utah County, Utah